These are the official results of the Women's javelin throw event at the 1986 European Championships in Stuttgart, West Germany, held at Neckarstadion on 28 and 29 August 1986.  All results were made with a rough surfaced javelin (old design).

Medalists

Abbreviations
All results shown are in metres

Records

Results

Final
29 August

Qualification
28 August

Participation
According to an unofficial count, 18 athletes from 13 countries participated in the event.

 (1)
 (1)
 (2)
 (1)
 (1)
 (1)
 (1)
 (2)
 (1)
 (1)
 (2)
 (3)
 (1)

See also
 1982 Women's European Championships Javelin Throw (Athens)
 1983 Women's World Championships Javelin Throw (Helsinki)
 1984 Women's Olympic Javelin Throw (Los Angeles)
 1987 Women's World Championships Javelin Throw (Rome)
 1988 Women's Olympic Javelin Throw (Seoul)
 1990 Women's European Championships Javelin Throw (Split)

References

 Results
 todor66

Javelin throw
Javelin throw at the European Athletics Championships
1986 in women's athletics